Campion School was formed in 1977 when it moved to the present site on Sydenham Drive in Leamington Spa, Warwickshire, England. In 2006, Campion was awarded dual specialisms of Business and Enterprise, and Visual Arts. The school became an academy on 1 January 2012.

Campion School is a mixed 11 to 18 secondary school. Although the school mainly serves South Leamington, it also take pupils from Whitnash, Radford Semele and Bishop's Tachbrook, other areas of Leamington, and the Heathcote area of Warwick. The maximum number of pupils admitted in any one year is 155.

Facilities
Campion School has facilities that include: sports hall, youth centre, adult education centre, sixth form centre, playing fields, community rooms, conference/assembly hall, floodlit activity area, provision for the disabled, and a new technology block.

Sydenham Sports Centre is a dual use facility opened in the late 1970s that is situated in the school grounds.

References

External links

Academies in Warwickshire
Schools in Leamington Spa
Educational institutions established in 1973
Secondary schools in Warwickshire
1973 establishments in England